Dominik Graňák (born June 11, 1983) is a Slovak professional ice hockey defenceman, currently playing for HC Škoda Plzeň of the Czech Extraliga (ELH).

On November 4, 2014, Graňák signed a one-year contract in returning to the SHL with Linköpings HC. He joined the club as a free agent after four seasons with Russian club, HC Dynamo Moscow of the Kontinental Hockey League.

He has represented Slovakia in four IIHF World Championships, including 2007.

Career statistics

Regular season and playoffs

International

Achievements
 Czech Extraliga champion: 2002/03 
 Elitserien champion: 2008/09
 Gagarin Cup: 2011/12

References

External links

1983 births
Living people
Färjestad BK players
HC Dynamo Moscow players
HC Fribourg-Gottéron players
HC Karlovy Vary players
HC Slavia Praha players
Ice hockey players at the 2018 Winter Olympics
Linköping HC players
Olympic ice hockey players of Slovakia
People from Havířov
Rögle BK players
Slovak expatriate ice hockey players in Russia
Slovak expatriate ice hockey players in Sweden
Slovak ice hockey defencemen
Stadion Hradec Králové players
HC Plzeň players
Sportspeople from the Moravian-Silesian Region
Slovak expatriate ice hockey players in the Czech Republic
Slovak expatriate ice hockey players in Switzerland